Igor Grabucea (born April 29, 1976) is a Moldovan weightlifter. His personal best is 267.5 kg.

He competed in Weightlifting at the 2008 Summer Olympics in the 56 kg division finishing fourteenth with 239 kg.

He is 5 ft 1 inches tall and weighs 123 lb.

Notes and references

External links
 Athlete Biography at beijing2008
 NBC profile

Moldovan male weightlifters
1976 births
Living people
Weightlifters at the 2008 Summer Olympics
Olympic weightlifters of Moldova
European Weightlifting Championships medalists
20th-century Moldovan people
21st-century Moldovan people